KONQ (91.9 FM) is a radio station  broadcasting a Variety format. Licensed to Dodge City, Kansas, United States, the station serves the Southwest Kansas area.  The station is currently owned by Dodge City Community College.

History
The station went on the air as KINF-FM in 1977. On March 22, 1993, the station changed its call sign to the current KONQ.

References

External links

ONQ
Radio stations established in 1990
1990 establishments in Kansas